Caroline Coral Shevlin Ormachea (born 17 September 1989) is an American-born Peruvian former footballer who played as a centre back or a midfielder. She has been a member of the Peru women's national team.

Early life
Shevlin was raised in San Diego, California. She was born to an American father and a Peruvian mother.

High school and college career
Shevlin has attended the Westview High School in San Diego, the California State University in Long Beach and the Saint Mary's College of California in Moraga.

Club career
Shevlin has played for San Diego WFC SeaLions in the United States.

International career
Shevlin represented Peru at the 2006 South American U-20 Women's Championship. She capped at senior level during the 2006 South American Women's Football Championship.

Personal life
Shevlin's twin sister Grace Shevlin is also a former Peruvian international footballer.

References

1989 births
Living people
Citizens of Peru through descent
Peruvian women's footballers
Women's association football central defenders
Women's association football midfielders
Peru women's international footballers
Twin sportspeople
Peruvian twins
Sportspeople from Columbia, Missouri
Soccer players from Missouri
Soccer players from San Diego
American women's soccer players
Long Beach State Beach women's soccer players
Saint Mary's Gaels women's soccer players
Women's Premier Soccer League players
American sportspeople of Peruvian descent
American twins